Team DSM is a professional cycling team based in the Netherlands, which competes in elite road bicycle racing events such as the UCI Women's World Tour. The team is sponsored by Dutch health, nutrition and materials company DSM.

History

2011

2012

2013

The team's first overall General classification victory came in the Ladies Tour of Qatar, where Kirsten Wild won the overall classification, points classification and three stages. Wild went on to win the women's edition of Gent–Wevelgem, four stages of the Energiewacht Tour.

2014

2014 proved to be the team's standout seasons since its creation; Kirsten Wild successfully defended her Tour of Qatar title, taking 3 stage wins in the process, as well as teammate Amy Pieters taking a stage and the young rider classification. Pieters continued her good form winning the women's Omloop Het Nieuwsblad. The team's next GC victory came courtesy of Wild, at the Tour of Chongming Island. Claudia Häusler secured the team's final overall victory of the 2014 season, winning the 2014 La Route de France.

On 24 September 2014 the team announced that they had secured a four-year sponsorship deal with a German hair care company. For the 2015 season the team was known as Team Liv–Plantur, with the men's team becoming Team Giant-Alpecin.

Sabrina Stultiens was the only rider who joined the team for the 2015 season.

2015

2017
The team won the 2017 UCI Road World Championships – Women's team time trial.

Team roster

Major wins

2011
Track Cycling World Cup in Astana – team pursuit, Amy Pieters (with Ellen van Dijk and Kirsten Wild)
2012
Le Samyn des Dames, Adrie Visser
Ronde van Gelderland, Suzanne de Goede
Omloop der Kempen, Suzanne de Goede
Erondegemse Pijl, Adrie Visser
 Sprint classification Belgium Tour, Janneke Busser Kanis
2013
  Overall Ladies Tour of Qatar, Kirsten Wild
 Points classification, Kirsten Wild
Stages 2, 3, & 4, Kirsten Wild
Gent–Wevelgem, Kirsten Wild
 Points classification Energiewacht Tour, Kirsten Wild
Stages 1, 2, 3b & 4, Kirsten Wild
Ronde van Gelderland, Kirsten Wild
Stage 1 Tour of Chongming Island, Lucy Garner
Districtskampioenschap, Amy Pieters
 Youth classification Belgium Tour, Amy Pieters
Stages 2 & 3, Kirsten Wild
 Points classification Holland Ladies Tour, Kirsten Wild
Stages 1 & 3, Kirsten Wild
Stage 4, Elke Gebhardt
2014
  Overall Ladies Tour of Qatar, Kirsten Wild
 Points classification, Kirsten Wild
 Youth classification, Amy Pieters
Stages 1, 3 & 4, Kirsten Wild
Stage 2, Amy Pieters
Omloop Het Nieuwsblad, Amy Pieters
Novilon EDR Cup, Kirsten Wild
Vlaams-Brabant Provincial Time Trial Championships, Maaike Polspoel
 Points classification Energiewacht Tour, Kirsten Wild
Stage 1, Kirsten Wild
 British rider classification The Women's Tour, Lucy Garner
 Overall Tour of Chongming Island, Kirsten Wild
 Points classification, Kirsten Wild
Stages 1 & 2, Kirsten Wild
Trofee Maarten Wynants, Maaike Polspoel
Tour of Chongming Island World Cup, Kirsten Wild
Parel van de Veluwe, Floortje Mackaij
 Overall La Route de France, Claudia Häusler
Stage 1, Claudia Häusler
Stages 4 & 6, Kirsten Wild
 Sprint classification Holland Ladies Tour, Sara Mustonen
 Combativity award Stage 2, Willeke Knol
2015
Soudal Cyclocross Leuven, Sabrina Stultiens
Gent–Wevelgem, Floortje Mackaij
Stage 3 Festival Luxembourgeois du cyclisme féminin Elsy Jacobs, Floortje Mackaij
Prologue La Route de France, Amy Pieters
Stage 1 La Route de France, Lucy Garner
Stage 3 Belgium Tour, Floortje Mackaij
2016
Acht van Westerveld, Leah Kirchmann
Prologue Giro d'Italia Femminile, Leah Kirchmann
2017
Omloop Het Nieuwsblad, Lucinda Brand
Trofeo Alfredo Binda-Comune di Cittiglio, Coryn Rivera
Tour of Flanders for Women, Coryn Rivera
 Overall Healthy Ageing Tour, Ellen van Dijk
 Points classification, Ellen van Dijk
Teams classification
Stage 1a (ITT), Ellen van Dijk
Stage 3 Tour of California, Coryn Rivera
Stage 8 Giro d'Italia Femminile, Lucinda Brand
Stage 5 Tour de Feminin-O cenu Českého Švýcarska, Juliette Labous
Erondegemse Pijl, Julia Soek
Team classification Ladies Tour of Norway
Prologue, Ellen van Dijk
2018
Omloop van het Hageland, Ellen van Dijk
Omloop van de Westhoek, Floortje Mackaij
Zwevezele Koerse, Floortje Mackaij
Dwars door Vlaanderen, Ellen van Dijk
 Points classification Thüringen Rundfahrt der Frauen, Coryn Rivera
 Youth classification, Liane Lippert
Teams classification
Stages 1 & 3, Coryn Rivera
Stage 7 (ITT), Ellen van Dijk
 Overall The Women's Tour, Coryn Rivera
 Sprints classification, Coryn Rivera
Stage 2, Coryn Rivera
 Points classification Tour de Feminin-O cenu Českého Švýcarska, Floortje Mackaij
Stages 1 & 4, Floortje Mackaij
 Team classification Giro Rosa
Stage 1, Team time trial
Stage 5, Ruth Winder
Team time trial, Ladies Tour of Norway
 Overall Madrid Challenge by La Vuelta, Ellen van Dijk
Stage 1, Team time trial
2019
 Young rider classification Tour of California, Juliette Labous
  Young rider classification Thüringen Rundfahrt der Frauen, Pernille Mathiesen
Team classification
Grand Prix Cycliste de Gatineau, Leah Kirchmann
 Mountains classification Holland Ladies Tour, Lucinda Brand
Stage 4, Franziska Koch
2020
 Points classification Women's Tour Down Under, Leah Kirchmann
 Mountains classification, Liane Lippert
 Youth classification, Liane Lippert
Team classification
2021
Scheldeprijs, Lorena Wiebes
Prologue Festival Elsy Jacobs, Lorena Wiebes
GP Eco-Struct, Lorena Wiebes
Stages 2 & 6 Thüringen Ladies Tour, Lorena Wiebes
Dwars door de Westhoek, Lorena Wiebes
Diamond Tour, Lorena Wiebes
Stage 1 Belgium Tour, Lorena Wiebes
Stages 5 & 8 Giro Rosa, Lorena Wiebes
Stage 10 Giro Rosa, Coryn Rivera
La Choralis Fourmies, Pfeiffer Georgi
Overall  Trophée des Grimpeuses, Floortje Mackaij
1st Stage 2, Floortje Mackaij
Stages 4 & 5 The Women's Tour, Lorena Wiebes
Ronde van Drenthe, Lorena Wiebes
2022
GP Oetingen, Lorena Wiebes
Ronde van Drenthe, Lorena Wiebes
Nokere Koerse voor Dames, Lorena Wiebes
Scheldeprijs, Lorena Wiebes
GP Eco-Struct, Charlotte Kool
Team classification Itzulia Women
 Overall Vuelta a Burgos Feminas, Juliette Labous
 Overall RideLondon Classique, Lorena Wiebes
 Points classification, Lorena Wiebes
Stages 1, 2 & 3, Lorena Wiebes

European and national champions

2012
 European U23 Track (Pursuit), Amy Pieters
2013
 European Track (Points race), Kirsten Wild
 Netherlands Track (Omnium), Kirsten Wild
 Netherlands Track (Individual pursuit), Kirsten Wild
 Netherlands Track (Scratch race), Kirsten Wild
 Netherlands Track (Madison), Amy Pieters & Kelly Markus
2014
 Netherlands Track (Points race), Kirsten Wild
 Netherlands Track (Individual pursuit), Amy Pieters
 Netherlands Track (Madison), Amy Pieters
2015
 Netherlands Track (Scratch race), Amy Pieters
2017
 European Time Trial Champion, Ellen van Dijk
2018
 Netherlands Cyclo-cross, Lucinda Brand
 Canada Time Trial, Leah Kirchmann
 European Time Trial Champion, Ellen van Dijk
2019
 Netherlands Cyclo-cross, Lucinda Brand
 Canada Time Trial, Leah Kirchmann
2021
 British Road Race, Pfeiffer Georgi 
2022
 British Under-23 Time Trial, Pfeiffer Georgi 
 Germany Road Race, Liane Lippert
 Netherlands Track (Omnium), Lorena Wiebes
 Netherlands Track (Elimination race), Lorena Wiebes
 Netherlands Track (Madison), Lorena Wiebes
 Netherlands Track (Scratch race), Lorena Wiebes

References

External links

 

 
UCI Women's Teams
Cycling teams based in the Netherlands
Cycling teams established in 2012